Taabo Department is a department of Agnéby-Tiassa Region in Lagunes District, Ivory Coast. In 2021, its population was 76,761 and its seat is the settlement of Taabo. The sub-prefectures of the department are  Pacobo and Taabo.

History
Taabo Department was created in 2012 by dividing Tiassalé Department.

Notes

Departments of Agnéby-Tiassa
States and territories established in 2012
2012 establishments in Ivory Coast